The SNCF Class BB 9200 1500 V DC electric locomotives were built by Schneider-Jeumont/CEM between 1958-1964. 92 of them were built, the last being withdrawn in 2014.

History 
These locomotives are products of the Jacquemin product family, offspring of the prototype BB 9004, and named after the engineer who designed their bogies.

In the late sixties, a small group of locomotives was converted for  operation, hauling prestige TEE trains like the Capitole - these locomotives were called the BB 9200 Capitole. These types were later superseded by the CC 6500 locomotives. Some of these locomotives covered more than  before they were withdrawn.

Service 
The regular services of the BB 9200 locomotives were inter-regional trains between Paris Montparnasse and Le Mans, between Paris Austerlitz and Tours and between Paris Gare de Lyon, Dijon and Lyon. Some were in service on freight trains. Phasing out of the class was completed by 2014.

Names
Two members of the class were named.

BB 9200 Capitole 

The BB 9200 Capitole was a variant of the SNCF Class BB 9200 locomotive specially constructed for operating high speed trains running at speeds greater than ). Due to the special colour scheme they were also called the BB rouge. They also sported Capitole front plates and single-arm pantographs; the rest of the class had diamond pantographs. From 1967 to 1970 the SNCF started the high speed service with the Capitole between Paris and Toulouse.

Models of the BB 9200 rouges with their Capitol plates were produced by Märklin, Lima, Jouef and Roco.

References

External links 

 Märklin SNCF BB 9200 BahnWahn.de

09200
Schneider locomotives
CEM locomotives
Bo′Bo′ locomotives
1500 V DC locomotives
Standard gauge electric locomotives of France
Railway locomotives introduced in 1958
Passenger locomotives